The 1987 Mid-American Conference men's basketball tournament was held March 5-7 at Centennial Hall in Toledo, Ohio.  Top-seeded Central Michigan defeated  in the championship game by  the score of 64–63 to win their first MAC men's basketball tournament and a bid to the NCAA tournament. There they lost to UCLA in the first round.  Dan Majerle of Central Michigan was named the tournament MVP.

Format
Seven of the nine MAC teams participated.  All games were played at Centennial Hall in Toledo, Ohio.

Bracket

References

Mid-American Conference men's basketball tournament
Tournament
MAC men's basketball tournament
MAC men's basketball tournament